Liu Yanan (born 29 September 1980 in Dalian, Liaoning) is a retired Chinese volleyball player. She currently plays club ball for Liaoning, and has played for the national team during many of its recent successes.

Awards

National team
 2001 World Grand Champion Cup -  Gold Medal
 2003 World Grand Prix -  Gold Medal
 2003 World Cup -  Gold Medal
 2004 Athens Olympic Games -  Gold Medal

External links
Profile at Liaoning Women's Volleyball Homepage

1980 births
Living people
Volleyball players from Dalian
Olympic bronze medalists for China
Olympic gold medalists for China
Olympic volleyball players of China
Volleyball players at the 2004 Summer Olympics
Volleyball players at the 2008 Summer Olympics
Olympic medalists in volleyball
Medalists at the 2008 Summer Olympics
Asian Games medalists in volleyball
Volleyball players at the 2002 Asian Games
Volleyball players at the 2006 Asian Games
Chinese women's volleyball players
Medalists at the 2004 Summer Olympics
Asian Games gold medalists for China
Medalists at the 2002 Asian Games
Medalists at the 2006 Asian Games
Middle blockers
21st-century Chinese women